The 2018 Roller Hockey Pan American Championship was the ninth edition of this tournament, played in Bogotá, Colombia between 4 and 9 December 2018.

This was the first time that the tournament was played independently from the Pan American Games and also the first time that served as qualifier for the 2019 Roller Hockey World Cup, by giving only three place to the World Cup and one more for the Intercontinental Cup, second tier.

Argentina conquered their eight title ever, the seventh consecutive.

Standings

Sixth place game

|}

Final bracket

Bracket

References

External links
World Skate

Roller hockey competitions
Roller Hockey Pan American Championship
Pan American Roller Hockey Championship, 2018
Roller Hockey Pan American
International roller hockey competitions hosted by China